In statistics, Bayesian multivariate linear regression is a
Bayesian approach to multivariate linear regression, i.e. linear regression where the predicted outcome is a vector of correlated random variables rather than a single scalar random variable. A more general treatment of this approach can be found in the article MMSE estimator.

Details

Consider a regression problem where the dependent variable to be predicted is not a single real-valued scalar but an m-length vector of correlated real numbers.  As in the standard regression setup, there are n observations, where each observation i consists of k−1 explanatory variables, grouped into a vector  of length k (where a dummy variable with a value of 1 has been added to allow for an intercept coefficient).  This can be viewed as a set of m related regression problems for each observation i:

where the set of errors  are all correlated. Equivalently, it can be viewed as a single regression problem where the outcome is a row vector  and the regression coefficient vectors are stacked next to each other, as follows:

The coefficient matrix B is a  matrix where the coefficient vectors  for each regression problem are stacked horizontally:

The noise vector  for each observation i is jointly normal, so that the outcomes for a given observation are correlated:

We can write the entire regression problem in matrix form as:

where Y and E are  matrices.  The design matrix X is an  matrix with the observations stacked vertically, as in the standard linear regression setup:

The classical, frequentists linear least squares solution is to simply estimate the matrix of regression coefficients  using the  Moore-Penrose pseudoinverse:

To obtain the Bayesian solution, we need to specify the conditional likelihood and then find the appropriate conjugate prior.  As with the univariate case of linear Bayesian regression, we will find that we can specify a natural conditional conjugate prior (which is scale dependent).

Let us write our conditional likelihood as

We seek a natural conjugate prior—a joint density   which is of the same functional form as the likelihood.

Using the same technique as with Bayesian linear regression, we decompose the exponential term using a matrix-form of the sum-of-squares technique. Here, however, we will also need to use the Matrix Differential Calculus (Kronecker product and vectorization transformations).

First, let us apply sum-of-squares to obtain new expression for the likelihood:

We would like to develop a conditional form for the priors:

where  is an inverse-Wishart distribution
This is accomplished using the vectorization transformation, which converts the likelihood from a function of the matrices  to a function of the vectors .

Write

Let

where  denotes the Kronecker product of matrices A and B, a generalization of the outer product which multiplies an  matrix by a  matrix to generate an  matrix, consisting of every combination of products of elements from the two matrices.

Then

With the likelihood in a more tractable form, we can now find a natural (conditional) conjugate prior.

Conjugate prior distribution

The natural conjugate prior using the vectorized variable  is of the form:

where

and

Posterior distribution

Using the above prior and likelihood, the posterior distribution can be expressed as:

where .
The terms involving  can be grouped (with ) using:

with

This now allows us to write the posterior in a more useful form:

This takes the form of an inverse-Wishart distribution times a Matrix normal distribution:

and

The parameters of this posterior are given by:

See also
 Bayesian linear regression
 Matrix normal distribution

References

 
 
 

Multivariate linear regression
Single-equation methods (econometrics)